Štefan Holiš (born 29 June 1992) is a Slovak footballer who plays for FK Blansko as a forward.

Career

Spartak Myjava
Holiš made his professional debut for Spartak Myjava against MFK Ružomberok on 6 August 2016.

References

External links
 Spartak Myjava official club profile
 Eurofotbal profile
  
 Futbalnet Profile

1992 births
Living people
Slovak footballers
Association football forwards
Spartak Myjava players
FK Poprad players
MŠK Púchov players
Slovak Super Liga players
2. Liga (Slovakia) players
Czech National Football League players
FK Blansko players